Glenea rufa is a species of beetle in the family Cerambycidae. It was described by Stephan von Breuning in 1956. It is known from Borneo.

References

rufa
Beetles described in 1956